Oscar McInerney (born 10 July 1994) is a professional Australian rules footballer playing for the Brisbane Lions in the Australian Football League (AFL). He was drafted by Brisbane with pick 37 in the 2017 rookie draft. He made his debut in the loss to Greater Western Sydney at Sydney Showground Stadium in round 6 of the 2018 season.

Early life and junior football
Oscar attended Ringwood Secondary College in Melbourne's east, graduating in 2012. McInerney was recruited to the VFL club Casey Scorpions for 2016, as a 204 cm ruckman, quickly making an impression with his ability to cover the ground, accurate tap work and clean hands below the knees. Winner of the A. Todd Medal for the best player in the AFL Victoria Development League, McInerney featured in the Scorpions’ VFL Finals campaign and attended the NAB AFL State Combine.

AFL career

2017
After being drafted to the Brisbane Lions McInereny began playing in the NEAFL for the Brisbane Lions reserves. Making his debut in round 2 of the season, McInerney was super impressive in the ruck and in attack, with 21 possessions and four inside 50s. Round 3 saw McInerney continue to impress in the ruck and drifting forward, with 20 possessions and eight clearances. In round 4 he was progressing nicely and kicked two goals and had 15 hitouts. In round 5 he was mostly used in attack with spurts in the ruck. Kicked two goals and continued to impress. Returning from the bye in round 6, in round 7 McInerney shared ruck duties with Smith and was handy enough, with 25 hitouts. Round 8 was similar in a rotating ruck role with 22 hitouts and kicked two goals. Returning to do most of the rucking in round 9, he ended with 25 hitouts and booted a goal. In Round 10, McInerney had one of his best games to date with an impressive 46 hitouts and booted four goals! Round 12 saw McInerney face of his biggest challenged, with his hands full in the ruck with Suns big men. Had 14 hitouts to go with 14 possessions. Growing as a dominant ruckman in Round 13, McInerney had 41 hitouts as the Lions defeated Southport by 150 points. In Round 14, McInerney had a hard day in ruck, and was probably beaten on the day, despite the Lions winning comfortably. Bouncing back in Round 15 McInerney controlled the ruck from the outset, with a dominant 49 hitouts and nine inside 50s. Starting to build, in round 16 Oscar gave midfielders first use, with 47 hitouts and two goals in a thumping win. Following their third bye of the season, in round 18 McInerney played second ruck to Smith and did his job. 17 hitouts, but needed to be cleaner with the footy around the ground. Round 19 he played as the second choice ruck again and did his job with 35 hitouts, nine disposals and five clearances. In Round 20 Oscar shared ruck duties once again and comprehensively got the better of Swans big men. Shifting to a secondary ruckman in the second half of the season, in Round 21 McInerney Kicked two goals and did some good work. Round 22 was a dominant game as McInerney went on to get 23 hitouts and three important goals. Finishing second on the NEAFL ladder behind Sydney, McInereny was a crucial part of the Lions finals campaign, with Oscar listed among the best players on the ground in there Semi-Final match up against Sydney University. McInerney was part of the Lions' NEAFL premiership in 2017, as the Lions went on to defeat Sydney by 3 points.

2018
Oscar made his debut for the Lions in Round 6 of the 2018 season where he had 7 disposals, 9 hit-outs and 3 tackles.

AFL statistics
Updated to the end of the 2022 season.

|-
| 2017 ||  || 46
| 0 || – || – || – || – || – || – || – || – || – || – || – || – || – || – || – || – || –
|-
| 2018 ||  || 46
| 16 || 14 || 8 || 77 || 57 || 134 || 45 || 37 || 176 || 0.9 || 0.5 || 4.8 || 3.6 || 8.4 || 2.8 || 2.3 || 11.0 || 0
|-
| 2019 ||  || 46
| 21 || 10 || 7 || 76 || 97 || 173 || 55 || 55 || 336 || 0.5 || 0.3 || 3.6 || 4.6 || 8.2 || 2.6 || 2.6 || 16.0 || 0
|-
| 2020 ||  || 46
| 19 || 6 || 5 || 91 || 75 || 166 || 33 || 57 || 363 || 0.3 || 0.2 || 4.7 || 3.9 || 8.7 || 1.7 || 3.0 || 19.1 || 0
|-
| 2021 ||  || 46
| 23 || 6 || 5 || 156 || 145 || 301 || 53 || 51 || 672 || 0.3 || 0.2 || 6.8 || 6.3 || 13.1 || 2.3 || 2.2 || 29.2 || 1
|-
| 2022 ||  || 46
| 22 || 9 || 7 || 132  || 128 || 260 || 45 || 64 || 576 || 0.4 || 0.3 || 6.0 || 5.8 || 11.8 || 2.0 || 2.9 || 26.2 || 0
|- class=sortbottom
! colspan=3 | Career
! 101 !! 45 !! 31 !! 532 !! 502 !! 1034 !! 231 !! 264 !! 2123 !! 0.4 !! 0.3 !! 5.3 !! 5.0 !! 10.2 !! 2.3 !! 2.6 !! 21.0 !! 1
|}

Notes

References

External links

1994 births
Living people
Brisbane Lions players
Casey Demons players
Australian rules footballers from Victoria (Australia)